The School Street School is a historic school building at 40 School Street in Haverhill, Massachusetts, United States. The brick three-story building was designed by Joseph R. Richards and built in 1856. Stylistically it is a mixture of a number of popular revival styles of the mid-19th century. The building is located on a hill, and appears from some elevations to only have two stories. Its main entrances are located inside round brownstone arches, a typical Romanesque Revival feature. Its roof line features a deep, bracketed cornice, a typical Italianate feature. The bays of the north and south elevations are separated by decorated brick pilasters, a Greek Revival element. The building has a shallow hip roof which was originally topped by a cupola (removed during the early 20th century).

The building was listed on the National Register of Historic Places in 1986.

See also
National Register of Historic Places listings in Essex County, Massachusetts

References

National Register of Historic Places in Essex County, Massachusetts
Italianate architecture in Massachusetts
School buildings completed in 1856
Schools in Haverhill, Massachusetts